Peebles railway station may refer to:

Peebles railway station (1855) a former railway station in Peebles, Scotland built in 1855
Peebles railway station (1864) a former railway station in Peebles, Scotland built in 1864